

Windmills in Quebec

Notes
Mills still standing shown in bold. Known building dates are in bold text. Non-bold text denotes first known date.

References

Further reading

Quebec
Quebec
Windmills